Risnjak is a mountain in the Risnjak National Park, in Gorski Kotar, Croatia. It belongs to the Dinaric Alps mountain range. The name of the massif probably comes from ris, the Croatian word for lynx. Another interpretation suggests that it comes from the local word risje, which is a name for a type of grass.

The vegetation is very diverse. Thirty different plant communities have been recorded, of which the most common are beech and fir forests (Fagetum illyricum abietotosum) which go up to 1240 m and then are replaced by sub-alpine beeches (Fagetum croaticum subalpinum). The highest vegetation is a belt of mountain pine (Pinetum mughi croaticum). The fauna is also diverse, but has been less well researched. There are particularly many species of birds and mammals, including several types of chamois, while since 1974 the area has once again been inhabited by the ris (lynx).

The highest peak of Risnjak mountain is "Risnjak" or Veliki Risnjak at 1528 m.a.s.l. (the latter name means "Big Risnjak"), and it is also the highest peak in the Risnjak National Park, and the second in Gorski kotar next to Bjelolasica. On its southern slope is located the mountain lodge called Šloserov dom, built by Josip Schlosser. The peak can be reached only on foot, from Crni Lug (3 h) or from an unpaved road beginning in Gornje Jelenje (1 h).

The highest peaks of Risnjak mountain are: Veliki Risnjak (1528 m), Sjeverni Mali Risnjak (1434 m) and Južni Mali Risnjak (1448 m).

See also
 Risnjak National Park
 List of mountains in Croatia

References

External links

 Park's official site
 Risnjak National Park
 Risnjak - Hrvatskog planinarskog saveza

Mountains of Croatia
Landforms of Primorje-Gorski Kotar County